Jay DeMarcus (born Stanley Wayne DeMarcus Jr.; on April 26, 1971) is an American bassist, vocalist, pianist, record producer and songwriter. From 1999 to 2021, he was a member of the country pop group Rascal Flatts.

Early life
DeMarcus was born in Columbus, Ohio. He graduated from the Tree of Life Christian Schools and Fort Hayes Metropolitan Education Center in Columbus while living with his mother and sister. He also has a half-sister from his father's side of the family. DeMarcus attended Lee College in Cleveland, Tennessee, from 1990 to 1992. At the time, he traveled and performed as a keyboard player in the Christian music group New Harvest, led by Danny Murray.

Career
DeMarcus co-founded the contemporary Christian music group East to West and moved to Nashville, Tennessee, in 1993. In 1997, after East to West disbanded, he called his second cousin, Gary LeVox, with whom he played when they were younger, and convinced him to come to Nashville and provide some harmonies on Michael English's album Gospel, which he was producing. They engineered the album together, and became English's backup band and road manager. The album was nominated for the Dove Award for Inspirational Song of the Year.  He soon became bandleader for Chely Wright. Eventually, he met Joe Don who is now the group's other member. DeMarcus called Joe Don to fill in for a guitarist who had left the band one night.

In addition to producing for English, he has also produced albums for James Otto, Jo Dee Messina, Austins Bridge, Chicago and others. 

On March 4, 2010, DeMarcus and his band mates were guest stars on CSI: Crime Scene Investigation, appearing as themselves. In the episode titled "Unshockable" (10.14), he is electro-shocked by his bass guitar during a performance at a Vegas club, leaving him with total amnesia which he recovers from at the end of the episode. DeMarcus has continued to explore his acting career, appearing in the film A Country Christmas, as well as episodes of ABC's Nashville and Lifetime's Drop Dead Diva.

In October 2018, DeMarcus founded the label Red Street Records, an independent Christian music label.

Personal life
On May 15, 2004, DeMarcus married Allison Alderson  a former beauty queen who has held the titles Miss Tennessee 1999 and Miss Tennessee USA 2002. DeMarcus met her on the set while filming the video for the Rascal Flatts song, "These Days". Their first child, Madeline Leigh, was born in December 2010. In July 2012, he and Allison welcomed son Dylan Jay. He also has another daughter from a previous relationship, who he placed for adoption because he and his then-girlfriend were not ready to parent the baby.

Discography

Rascal Flatts (2000)
Melt (2002)
Feels Like Today (2004)
Me and My Gang (2006)
Still Feels Good (2007)
Unstoppable (2009)
Nothing Like This (2010)
Changed (2012)
Rewind (2014)
The Greatest Gift of All (2016)
Back to Us (2017)

Non-Rascal Flatts album credits

Filmography

Awards and nominations for producing

References

External links

1971 births
American country bass guitarists
American country record producers
Living people
Musicians from Columbus, Ohio
Songwriters from Ohio
Rascal Flatts members
Guitarists from Ohio
American male bass guitarists
Country musicians from Ohio
21st-century American bass guitarists
21st-century American male musicians
American male songwriters